União Futebol Comércio e Indústria is a football club based in Setúbal, Portugal. They currently compete in the First Division of the Setúbal Football Association.

The club was founded in 1917 under the name União dos Empregados do Comércio e Indústria de Setúbal, by Mário Gonçalves Pacheco, António Gonçalves Pacheco, José Mendes Nunes, Ildefonso Garrudo and Francisco dos Santos.

Honours 

 AF Setúbal – First Division

 Winners (2): 1977–78, 1992–93

 AF Setúbal – Second Division

 Winners (2): 2004–05, 2018–19

Notable players 

 José Mourinho (1985–1987)
Albert Meyong (2020–2021)

References

External links 

 Official website (in Portuguese)
 Playmakerstats

1917 establishments in Portugal
Association football clubs established in 1917
Football clubs in Portugal
Sport in Setúbal District